Casualties of War is a 1989 drama film directed by Brian De Palma.

Casualties of War may also refer to:

 Casualties of War (album), a 2007 album by Boot Camp Clik
 Casualties of War (novel), a Doctor Who novel by Steve Emmerson
 Casualties of War (Foyle's War), an episode of the British TV series Foyle's War
 Casualties of War (song), a song by Eric B. & Rakim